Yunnan, a province of the People's Republic of China, is made up of the following administrative divisions.

Administrative divisions
All of these administrative divisions are explained in greater detail at political divisions of China.

Recent changes in administrative divisions

Population composition

Prefectures

Counties

List of autonomous subdivisions by ethnic group

There are 29 autonomous counties and 8 autonomous prefectures assigned to 18 different ethnic minorities in Yunnan.

Yi (15 counties, 2 prefectures)
Shilin Yi Autonomous County, Kunming
Luquan Yi and Miao Autonomous County, Kunming
Xundian Hui and Yi Autonomous County, Kunming
Eshan Yi Autonomous County, Yuxi
Xinping Yi and Dai Autonomous County, Yuxi
Yuanjiang Hani, Yi and Dai Autonomous County, Yuxi
Ninglang Yi Autonomous County, Lijiang
Ning'er Hani and Yi Autonomous County, Pu'er
Jingdong Yi Autonomous County, Pu'er
Jinggu Dai and Yi Autonomous County, Pu'er
Zhenyuan Yi, Hani and Lahu Autonomous County, Pu'er
Jiangcheng Hani and Yi Autonomous County, Pu'er
Yangbi Yi Autonomous County, Dali
Nanjian Yi Autonomous County, Dali
Weishan Yi and Hui Autonomous County, Dali
Chuxiong Yi Autonomous Prefecture
Honghe Hani and Yi Autonomous Prefecture

Hui (2 counties)
Xundian Hui and Yi Autonomous County, Kunming
Weishan Yi and Hui Autonomous County, Dali

Miao (3 counties, 1 prefecture)
Luquan Yi and Miao Autonomous County
Jinping Miao, Yao and Dai Autonomous County, Honghe
Pingbian Miao Autonomous County, Honghe
Wenshan Zhuang and Miao Autonomous Prefecture

Yao (2 counties)
Jinping Miao, Yao and Dai Autonomous County, Honghe
Hekou Yao Autonomous County, Honghe

Zhuang (1 prefecture)
Wenshan Zhuang and Miao Autonomous Prefecture

Dai (6 counties, 2 prefectures)
Xinping Yi and Dai Autonomous County, Yuxi
Yuanjiang Hani, Yi and Dai Autonomous County, Yuxi
Jinggu Dai and Yi Autonomous County, Pu'er
Menglian Dai, Lahu and Va Autonomous County, Pu'er
Gengma Dai and Va Autonomous County, Lincang
Dehong Dai and Jingpo Autonomous Prefecture
Jinping Miao, Yao and Dai Autonomous County, Honghe
Xishuangbanna Dai Autonomous Prefecture

Lahu (4 counties)
Zhenyuan Yi, Hani and Lahu Autonomous County, Pu'er
Menglian Dai, Lahu and Va Autonomous County, Pu'er
Lancang Lahu Autonomous County, Pu'er
Shuangjiang Lahu, Va, Blang and Dai Autonomous County, Lincang

Hani (5 counties, 1 prefecture)
Yuanjiang Hani, Yi and Dai Autonomous County, Yuxi
Ning'er Hani and Yi Autonomous County, Pu'er
Mojiang Hani Autonomous County, Pu'er
Zhenyuan Yi, Hani and Lahu Autonomous County, Pu'er
Jiangcheng Hani and Yi Autonomous County, Pu'er
Honghe Hani and Yi Autonomous Prefecture

Wa (5 counties)
Menglian Dai, Lahu and Va Autonomous County, Pu'er
Ximeng Va Autonomous County, Pu'er
Shuangjiang Lahu, Va, Blang and Dai Autonomous County, Lincang
Gengma Dai and Va Autonomous County, Lincang
Cangyuan Va Autonomous County, Lincang

Bulang (1 county)
Shuangjiang Lahu, Va, Blang and Dai Autonomous County, Lincang

Jingpo (1 prefecture)
Dehong Dai and Jingpo Autonomous Prefecture

Bai (1 county, 1 prefecture)
Lanping Bai and Pumi Autonomous County, Nujiang
Dali Bai Autonomous Prefecture

Lisu (1 county, 1 prefecture)
Nujiang Lisu Autonomous Prefecture
Weixi Lisu Autonomous County, Dêqên

Naxi (1 county)
Yulong Naxi Autonomous County, Lijiang

Pumi (1 county)
Lanping Bai and Pumi Autonomous County, Nujiang

Dulong (1 county)
Gongshan Derung and Nu Autonomous County, Nujiang

Nu (1 county)
Gongshan Derung and Nu Autonomous County, Nujiang

Tibetan (1 prefecture)
Dêqên Tibetan Autonomous Prefecture

References

External links 
 Yunnan Provincial Government (2006-10-25)
 Administrative divisions network (2007-02-12)

Administrative divisions
Yunnan